Psammon (from Greek "psammos", "sand") is a group of organisms inhabiting coastal sand moist — biota buried in sediments. Psammon is a part of water fauna, along with periphyton, plankton, nekton, and benthos. Psammon is also sometimes considered a part of benthos due to its near-bottom distribution. Psammon term is commonly used to refer to freshwater reservoirs such as lakes.

References 

Marine animals
Biology terminology